Winchester is a city in St. Louis County, Missouri, United States. The population was 1,447 at the 2020 census.

Geography
Winchester is located at  (38.590003, -90.525756).

Demographics

2020 census
As of the 2020 census, there were 1,447 people and 546 households living in the city. The racial makeup of the city was 80.6% White (78.9% non-Hispanic White), 3.8% African American, 0.3% Native American, 2.7% Asian, 0.1% Pacific Islander, 2.8% from other races, and 9.7% from two or more races. Hispanic or Latino of any race were 6.9%.

2010 census
At the 2010 census there were 1,547 people, 596 households, and 386 families living in the city. The racial makeup of the city was 92.6% White, 1.2% African American, 0.5% Native American, 1.4% Asian, 0.1% Pacific Islander, 1.6% from other races, and 2.7% from two or more races. Hispanic or Latino of any race were 4.4%.

Of the 596 households 31.7% had children under the age of 18 living with them, 44.6% were married couples living together, 13.1% had a female householder with no husband present, 7.0% had a male householder with no wife present, and 35.2% were non-families. 29.2% of households were one person and 9.7% were one person aged 65 or older. The average household size was 2.44 and the average family size was 3.02.

The median age was 36.8 years. 22% of residents were under the age of 18; 7.3% were between the ages of 18 and 24; 32.5% were from 25 to 44; 22.1% were from 45 to 64; and 16.2% were 65 or older. The gender makeup of the city was 47.8% male and 52.2% female.

2000 census
At the 2000 census there were 1,651 people, 599 households, and 425 families living in the city. The racial makeup of the city was 95.88% White, 1.27% African American, 0.36% Native American, 0.97% Asian, 0.36% from other races, and 1.15% from two or more races. Hispanic or Latino of any race were 1.88%.

Of the 599 households 36.7% had children under the age of 18 living with them, 52.4% were married couples living together, 14.4% had a female householder with no husband present, and 29.0% were non-families. 23.4% of households were one person and 8.2% were one person aged 65 or older. The average household size was 2.58 and the average family size was 3.06.

The age distribution was 24.8% under the age of 18, 6.4% from 18 to 24, 34.2% from 25 to 44, 19.3% from 45 to 64, and 15.4% 65 or older. The median age was 36 years. For every 100 females, there were 85.9 males. For every 100 females age 18 and over, there were 80.3 males.

The median household income was $47,829 and the median family income  was $51,071. Males had a median income of $35,735 versus $27,500 for females. The per capita income for the city was $18,920. About 4.2% of families and 4.0% of the population were below the poverty line, including 6.2% of those under age 18 and 5.6% of those age 65 or over.

References

Cities in St. Louis County, Missouri
Cities in Missouri